Penrose is an unincorporated community in Transylvania County, North Carolina, United States. Penrose has a post office with ZIP code 28766.

References

Unincorporated communities in Transylvania County, North Carolina
Unincorporated communities in North Carolina